U Turn is a 1997 American neo-noir crime thriller film directed by Oliver Stone and starring Sean Penn, Billy Bob Thornton, Jennifer Lopez, Jon Voight, Powers Boothe, Joaquin Phoenix, Claire Danes, and Nick Nolte. It is based on the book Stray Dogs by John Ridley, who also wrote the screenplay.

Plot
Bobby Cooper is a drifter in debt to a violent gangster when his red 1964½ Ford Mustang Convertible breaks down in Superior, Arizona. Stranded and broke, he meets Jake and Grace McKenna, a father and his stepdaughter who are also a married couple. They separately approach Bobby to kill the other for money.

Desperate and in fear, Bobby approaches Jake about killing Grace. He becomes attracted to Grace and agrees to kill Jake, then he and Grace can be together and use Jake's money for a new start somewhere else.

With Grace's help, Bobby kills Jake, and they leave together with $200,000. As they make their way out of Superior, the Sheriff, with whom Grace has been having an affair, stops them. Grace shoots and kills the sheriff. As they dump the bodies, Grace pushes Bobby over the cliff, severely injuring him. Grace suddenly realizes that Bobby has the car keys.

Grace makes her way down the steep incline where she and Bobby fight, and in his weakened, injured state, Bobby kills Grace, but she also shoots him in the belly. He makes the grueling journey back up the cliff with a broken leg, then starts the car, but the radiator hose bursts, and Bobby is stranded in the heat, injured and dying.

Cast
 Sean Penn as Bobby Cooper
 Jennifer Lopez as Grace McKenna
 Nick Nolte as Jake McKenna
 Powers Boothe as Sheriff Virgil Potter
 Claire Danes as Jenny
 Joaquin Phoenix as Toby N. "TNT" Tucker
 Jon Voight as Blind Indian
 Billy Bob Thornton as Darrell
 Abraham Benrubi as Biker #1
 Sean Stone as Boy In Grocery Store
 Ilia Volok as Sergei
 Valery Nikolaev as Mr. Arkady
 Brent Briscoe as Ed
 Bo Hopkins as Boyd
 Julie Hagerty as Flo
 Sheri Foster as Grace's Mother
 Liv Tyler as Girl In Bus Station (Cameo)
 Laurie Metcalf as Bus Station Ticket Attendant

Production
U Turn was filmed during November 1996–January 1997 on location in Superior, Arizona and other areas of Arizona and California, including the Coachella Valley. It was filmed entirely on Reversal stock, 5239, to give an extra harsh look to the hostile environment.

Casting
For the Toby N. Tucker role, Joaquin Phoenix said small-town style gave him the inspiration and the idea for the haircut, which was "TNT" (the character's initials) shaved on the back of his head. "These kids in these small towns, these fads that just roll over them," he told Rough Cut Magazine in October 1998. "Like, five years pass and they still hang on to them. So, I thought it was really great if he shaves his name, he thinks he's really notorious."

Reception
Reaction by critics to the film was mixed.  Roger Ebert gave the film 1½ stars out of four, deeming it a "repetitive, pointless exercise in genre filmmaking—the kind of film where you distract yourself by making a list of the sources". James Berardinelli rated the film three stars out of four, stating "for those who enjoy movies on the edge, U-Turn offers just the trajectory you might expect." Mick LaSalle of the San Francisco Chronicle wrote that it "demonstrates a filmmaker in complete command of his craft and with little control over his impulses". U Turn currently holds a 59% rating on Rotten Tomatoes based on 54 reviews with the consensus: "U-Turn is a lurid, stylish lark that boasts striking moments but lacks the focus and weight of Oliver Stone's best work." On Metacritic, it has a rating of 54 out of 100 based on 20 reviews, indicating mixed or average reviews. Audiences polled by CinemaScore gave the film an average grade of "C+" on an A+ to F scale.

Later Oliver Stone said: “Certain people really liked U Turn. More than you might think claimed it was the one they “most liked” of my films. It’s certainly different, and its incest storyline was verboten to the average American viewer. Let’s just say, you need a sense of humor for this one.

The film was nominated for two Golden Raspberry Awards: Worst Director (which went to Kevin Costner for The Postman) and Worst Supporting Actor (Jon Voight, also for Most Wanted; ultimately, he "lost" to Dennis Rodman for Double Team). It was also included on Siskel and Ebert's "Worst Films of 1997" episode. In the episode, Gene Siskel reflected that  "U Turn [had] the same highly stylized violence as Stone's Natural Born Killers, but without that film's intellectual content, U Turn seems like Stone's attempt at a commercial hit – and he failed, miserably."

References

External links

 
 
 

1997 films
1990s crime drama films
1997 crime thriller films
1990s thriller drama films
Adultery in films
American crime drama films
American crime thriller films
American thriller drama films
Films about murderers
Films based on American novels
Films directed by Oliver Stone
Films produced by Clayton Townsend
Films with screenplays by John Ridley
Films with screenplays by Oliver Stone
Films scored by Ennio Morricone
Films set in Arizona
Films set in California
Films set in Superior, Arizona
Films shot in Arizona
Films shot in California
American neo-noir films
Phoenix Pictures films
TriStar Pictures films
1997 drama films
1990s English-language films
1990s American films